Leo Bemis (December 26, 1918 -  September 29, 2007) was a former American collegiate soccer coach. He was notable for serving as the University of Pittsburgh's head men's soccer coach from 1954 to 1983, a career spanning 30 years. He guided the Panthers to 155 career victories, making him the second winningest coach in school history. He is a 1941 graduate from Edinboro University of Pennsylvania, and a 1989 inductee into the school's athletic hall of fame. He received his master's degree in physical education from Pitt in 1947.

References

External links
https://web.archive.org/web/20080509082341/http://departments.edinboro.edu/athletics/hallfame/members-class/hof-inductees-1989.asp
https://www.legacy.com/obituaries/postgazette/obituary.aspx?n=leo-c-bemis&pid=95319379

Pittsburgh Panthers men's soccer coaches
University of Pittsburgh alumni
University of Pittsburgh faculty
Edinboro Fighting Scots football players
American soccer coaches
1918 births
2007 deaths